Chile–India relations are the foreign relations between Chile and India. Chile has an embassy in New Delhi and India has an embassy in Santiago.

Trade Relations

Chile was the first country in South America to sign a trade agreement with India, in 1956.  A Framework Agreement was signed on January 20, 2005 to promote further Economic Cooperation between India and Chile. The agreement proposed a Preferential Trade Agreement (PTA) between the respective countries, which after several rounds of negotiations was finalized during the talks held at New Delhi in November 2005. The PTA came into force with effect from 17 August 2007 in Chile and in India on 11 September 2007. 

In 2016, both countries signed an agreement to expand the India- Chile Preferential Trade Agreement (PTA), marking a 10-fold jump in the number of products to be traded on concessional duty rates. India's bilateral trade with Chile stood at $2.6 billion with exports at $0.68 billion and imports at $1.96 billion respectively in FY16.

Indians in Chile

The Indian community in Chile numbers around 1000+, mostly residing in Santiago, Iquique, Viña del Mar, and Punta Arenas. Largely engaged in small business and trade, the community is gradually being assimilated into the mainstream through naturalisation. An average of 1000 Chileans visit India annually, mainly for tourism.

See also
Embassy of India, Santiago

References

External links

 
India
Bilateral relations of India